Skull-Face is a fantasy novella by  American writer Robert E. Howard, which appeared as a serial in Weird Tales magazine, beginning in October 1929, and ending in December, 1929. The story stars a  character called Stephen Costigan but this is not Howard's recurring character, Sailor Steve Costigan. The story is clearly influenced by Sax Rohmer's opus Fu Manchu but substitutes the main Asian villain with a resuscitated Atlantean necromancer (similar to Kull's bit character Thulsa Doom) sitting at the center of a web of crime and intrigue meant to end White/Western world domination with the help of Asian/semite/African peoples and to re-instate surviving Atlanteans (said to lie dormant in submerged sarcophagi) as the new ruling elite.

References

External links

 

1929 short stories
Short stories by Robert E. Howard
Pulp stories
Characters in pulp fiction
Horror short stories
Works originally published in Weird Tales
Atlantis in fiction